The discography of Therese, a Swedish pop singer-songwriter, consists of one studio album, eight singles and six featuring singles.

Albums

Studio albums

Extended plays

Singles

As featured artist

Other appearances

References

Pop music discographies
Discographies of Swedish artists